ʿĀtikah bint Yazīd was an Umayyad princess. She was the daughter of Yazid I, and wife of  Abd al-Malik ibn Marwan. Some called her the scholar cause she studied islam, especially Hadith. She was also called generous as she gave up all of her money for a poor member of Abu Sufyan's family.

Life
Atikah was the daughter of second Umayyad caliph Yazid. She was the sister of third Umayyad caliph Mu'awiya II. Before Yazid I died, he had the bay'ah made to his son. Mu'awiya II succeeded his father in Damascus in 64 AH (November 683 CE), at an age of somewhere between 17. Her brother died in 684 and he was succeeded by succeeded by her Father-in-law Marwan, he ruled for one year and died in 685. Marwan was succeeded by her husband Abd al-Malik as the fifth Umayyad caliph. She was the influential wife of Abd al-Malik, her elder son was nominated heir of the Caliphate.

By dint of his descent, her son Yazid was a natural candidate for the succession to the caliphate. A noble Arab maternal lineage held political weight during this period in the Caliphate's history, and Yazid took pride in his maternal Sufyanid descent, viewing himself superior to his Marwanid brothers. He was chosen by his paternal half-brother Caliph Sulayman as the second-in-line for the caliphate after their first cousin Umar II, who ruled from 717 to 720. Yazid acceded at the age of 29 following the death of Umar II on 9 February 720. Yazid II's pedigree united his father's Marwanid branch of the Umayyad dynasty, in power since 684, and the Sufyanid branch of Yazid I and the latter's father Mu'awiya I, founder of the Umayyad Caliphate.

Atikah and Abd al-Malik had sons; Yazid II, Marwan al-Asghar, Mu'awiya and a daughter, Umm Kulthum. from their marriage.

However, Atikah was known as she was a relative to twelve Umayyad caliphs out of fourteen. This enabled her to take off her Hijab in front of them. No other known woman that had such number of mahrams between caliphs.

She survived the death of her grandson Al Walid II.

Caliphs related to her
The Caliphs who were related to her are:

Notes

References

Bibliography
 
 
 
 
 

8th-century deaths
Children of Umayyad caliphs
Year of birth unknown
8th-century women writers
Women from the Umayyad Caliphate
Arab women
Women scholars of the medieval Islamic world
Hadith scholars
Arab princesses
8th-century Arabs